Ali Patiyo Oyai Mamai is a 2006 Sri Lankan Sinhala children family film directed by Srilal Priyadeva and co-produced by Lalindra Wijewickrama, N. Udaya Kumar, P. Arooran and Ravi Fernando for M.G.L Films. It stars child actor Jananjaya Lakmal with Bimal Jayakody, Ananda Wickramage, and Bandu Samarasinghe in lead roles along with Teddy Vidyalankara, and Eardley Wedamuni. Music composed by renowned musician Edward Jayakody. The film earned Rs. 9 million collection from the first 17 days of screening.

Plot

Cast
 Jananjaya Lakmal as Chaman
 Bimal Jayakody as Chaman's father Veterinary surgeon Viraj
 Ananda Wickramage as Thief Suminda
 Bandu Samarasinghe as Thief Chaminda
 Vathika Ravinath as Suraj
 Prashani Perera as Chamari
 Teddy Vidyalankara as Vedda
 Eardley Wedamuni as Ranger
 Anura Bandara Rajaguru as Bandila Aththo
 Ranjani Rajmohan as Lechchami

Soundtrack

References

2006 films
2000s Sinhala-language films
Films set in Sri Lanka (1948–present)